Collagen type IV alpha-3-binding protein, also known as ceramide transfer protein (CERT) or StAR-related lipid transfer protein 11 (STARD11) is a protein that in humans is encoded by the COL4A3BP gene.  The protein contains a pleckstrin homology domain at its amino terminus and a START domain towards the end of the molecule.  It is a member of the StarD2 subfamily of START domain proteins.

Function and structure 

Ceramide transferase protein (or CERT) is responsible for the transfer of ceramide from the endoplasmic reticulum (ER) to the Golgi apparatus. Ceramide plays a very important role in the metabolism and biosynthesis of sphingolipid. More specifically, it is synthesized at the ER, then is transferred by CERT to Golgi where it is converted to sphingomyelin (SM).

There are two pathways through which this transfer takes place: a major pathway, which is ATP and cytosol-dependent and a minor pathway, which is ATP- and cytosol-independent.

CERT is a 68kDa protein that consists of three different parts, each of which with a special role:

 Pleckstrin homology domain (PH): It is the aminoterminal domain and it consists of about 100 aminoacid residues.  The main function of this part of CERT is to recognize and bind various phosphatidylinositol phosphates (PIPs) with different level of specificity.  The isomers of PIPs are distributed to various organelles: PI-4,5-diphosphate goes to the plasma membrane, PI-3-monophosphate to endosomes and PI-4-monophosphate to Golgi. PH domain of wild-type CERT has been found to recognize specifically PI4P and therefore CERT targets the Golgi apparatus or the  trans-Golgi network.
 START domain: It consists of about 210 amino acid residues and has an important role in the transfer of ceramide, which is that it can recognize specifically only the natural D-erythro isomer of ceramide and extract it from the membrane.
 FFAT motif (two phenylalanines in an acidic tract, that has a conserved sequence "EFFDAxE"): It is a short domain situated between PH and START domain and is the one responsible for the interaction of CERT with ER. More specifically, it binds to the ER resident type II membrane protein, vesicle-associated membrane protein (VAMP) associated protein (VAP), an interaction that is necessary for the transfer of ceramide from the ER to Golgi.

All of these domains are important for the transfer of ceramide, since first of all CERT will extract newly synthesized ceramide from the membrane with the help of its START domain. Then, ceramide will be transferred through the cytosol towards Golgi because of the interaction between the PH domain and PI4P. Finally, interaction with ER is facilitated through the binding of the FFAT motif with vesicle-associated membrane protein.

Regulation 

The transport of ceramide by CERT requires ATP.  CERT – when expressed in mammalian cells – has been found to receive a lot of possible phosphorylations at the serine repeat (SR) motif, which is close to the PH domain.

It has been shown that the phosphorylation of this SR motif leads to inactivation of the PI4P-binding and ceramide transferring activities of CERT, since it induces an autoinhibitory reaction between the PH and START domains of CERT, transforming it from the active form to the inactive form.

Protein kinase D (PKD) has been found to phosphorylate the SR motif of CERT. Also, CERT is further phosphorylated by the casein kinase 1 family leading to hyperphosphorylation of the SR motif.  On the other hand, the integral membrane protein protein phosphatase 2Cε  (PP2Cε), which is located on the endoplasmic reticulum induces dephosphorylation of CERT.  Dephosphorylated CERT is in the active form in order to be functional and transfer ceramide from ER to Golgi.

Inhibitor HPA-12 

The chemically synthesized compound N-(30hydroxy-1-hydroxymethyl-3-phenylpropyl)dodecamide (HPA-12) has been found to be an inhibitor of CERT-mediated ceramide trafficking.
More specifically, this drug inhibits the ATP-dependent transport of ceramide from ER to Golgi (and therefore the conversion of ceramide to sphingomyelin), but it does not inhibit protein trafficking. This suggests that Ceramide is still transformed to Glycosylceramide at Golgi. Moreover, it has been shown that it does not inhibit the Sphingomyelin synthase in vitro or in vivo.
Moreover, only the (1R, 3R) isomer of HPA-12 has been found to be an active inhibitor and the length of the chain as well as the two hydroxyl-groups are very important for the inhibitory activity.

Clinical significance 

This gene encodes a kinase also known as Goodpasture antigen-binding protein that specifically phosphorylates the N-terminal region of the non-collagenous domain of the alpha 3 chain of type IV collagen, known as the Goodpasture antigen. Goodpasture's syndrome is the result of an autoimmune response directed at this antigen. One isoform of this protein is also involved in ceramide intracellular transport. Two transcripts exist for this gene.

Model organisms
Model organisms have been used in the study of COL4A3BP function. A conditional knockout mouse line called Col4a3bptm1a(KOMP)Wtsi was generated at the Wellcome Trust Sanger Institute. Male and female animals underwent a standardized phenotypic screen to determine the effects of deletion. Additional screens performed: In-depth immunological phenotyping – in-depth bone and cartilage phenotyping

References

Further reading

External links